Faouzia Aloui (born in 1957 in Kasserine) is a Tunisian poet and fiction writer. She is a teacher of Arabic literature in secondary school since 1980.

Work
She is a poet and fiction writer with two collections of poetry and three books of short stories.

Poetry
 Flying isthme (1997)

Books
 A Living Corpse (2010)
 Ali and the foal of wind (1995)
 The pigment (1999)

References

20th-century Tunisian poets
1957 births
Living people
Tunisian women poets
Tunisian women short story writers
20th-century Tunisian women writers
20th-century Tunisian writers
21st-century Tunisian women writers
21st-century Tunisian writers
People from Kasserine Governorate
21st-century Tunisian poets